Molly Cowan is a New Zealander former sprinter.

At the 1962 British Empire and Commonwealth Games she won the bronze medal in the women's 4 x 110 yards relay. Her teammates in the relay were Nola Bond, Avis McIntosh and Doreen Porter. At the Games she also competed individually in the 100 and 200 metres, making the semi-finals of the latter.

References

New Zealand female sprinters
Commonwealth Games bronze medallists for New Zealand
Athletes (track and field) at the 1962 British Empire and Commonwealth Games
Commonwealth Games medallists in athletics
Possibly living people
Year of birth missing
Medallists at the 1962 British Empire and Commonwealth Games